Edward Corwin may refer to:
 Edward Henry Lewinski Corwin  (1885–1953), American author of historical books
 Edward Samuel Corwin (1878–1963), American law professor
 Edward Tanjore Corwin (1834–1914), American clergyman and historian of the Reformed Church in America

See also
 Corwin (disambiguation)